The 1904–05 Cincinnati Bearcats men's basketball team represented the University of Cincinnati during the 1904–05 collegiate men's basketball season. The head coach was Amos Foster, coaching his first season with the Bearcats.

Schedule

|-

References

Cincinnati Bearcats men's basketball seasons
Cincinnati Bearcats men's basketball team
Cincinnati Bearcats men's basketball team
Cincinnati Bearcats men's basketball team